"Shall We Gather at the River?" or simply "At the River" are the popular names for the traditional Christian hymn originally titled "Beautiful River" and subsequently titled "Hanson Place," written by American poet and gospel music composer Robert Lowry (1826–1899). It was written in 1864 and is now in the public domain. The title "Hanson Place" is a reference to the original Hanson Place Baptist Church in Brooklyn, where Lowry, as a Baptist minister, sometimes served. The original building now houses a different denomination. 

The music is in the key of D and uses an 8.7.8.7 R meter. An arrangement was also composed by Charles Ives, and a later arrangement is included in Aaron Copland's Old American Songs (1952) in addition to being used by German composer Anton Plate  in 'At The River' (2003), and by American wind band composer David Maslanka in his Symphony No. 9 (2011). The song was sung live at the 1980 funeral of American Supreme Court Justice William O. Douglas.

There have been many recordings of the hymn including those by Patti Page, Burl Ives and Willie Nelson.

Lyrics 
The song's lyrics refer to the Christian concept of the anticipation of restoration and reward, and reference the motifs found at  - a crystal clear river with water of life, issuing from the throne of heaven, all presented by an angel of God.

Chorus :
Yes, we’ll gather at the river,
The beautiful, the beautiful river;
Gather with the saints at the river
That flows by the throne of God.

Music

In popular culture

In film Westerns
The song was often employed in Western soundtracks, particularly those of director John Ford (being one of his favorite hymns) and it features in many of Ford's most famous films. The melody is played paradoxically in Stagecoach (1939), in the early scene is which Claire Trevor's character Dallas is run out of town. It also appears in Ford's Tobacco Road (1941), My Darling Clementine (1946), Three Godfathers (1948), Wagon Master (1950), twice in The Searchers (1956),  and 7 Women (1966). 

The song is also heard in Gene Fowler, Jr.'s The Oregon Trail (1959) and in Elliot Silverstein's Cat Ballou (1965). It was used in the Sam Peckinpah films Major Dundee (1965) and also The Wild Bunch (1969) where it was employed as ironic counterpoint during an onscreen massacre. It was similarly put to use in such dark, late-period Westerns as 1968's Hang 'Em High and 1972's Jeremiah Johnson.

The song was used in Gore Verbinski's infamous 2013 pastiche western, The Lone Ranger.

In other films
It features prominently in David Lean's romantic comedy Hobson's Choice (1954) and in Richard Brooks's drama Elmer Gantry (1960). A caricatural vocal rendition of the song (with new revival-style lyrics) is used for both a car chase and the end credits of Howard Morris' caper comedy, Who's Minding the Mint? (1967). It is also included in the film adaptation of The Handmaid's Tale (film).

Part of the hymn was sung in the Academy Award-winning period film, Trip to Bountiful (1985). The hymn is a primary musical theme for schlock film Tromeo and Juliet (1996), credited on the soundtrack as Yes, We'll Gather at the River. The title "Shall We Gather at the River" is used as the name of a second season episode of Falling Skies.  The hymn opens Richard Rossi's 1920s period piece drama Aimee Semple McPherson.

International use
In Sweden, the 1876 hymn to the same melody O, hur saligt att få vandra ("O, how blessed it is to walk") became one of the most popular songs of the widespread Swedish revivalist movement. A drinking song to the same melody, Jag har aldrig vart på snusen, partly mocking the religious message of the Swedish original, is one of the most popular drinking songs at Swedish universities.

In Germany, the melody of the hymn became a well-known christmas carol named Welchen Jubel, welche Freude ("What rejoice, o what a joy") with the lyrics of Ernst Gebhardt (1832-1899).

In 1937, the tune was adopted in Japan to a popular enka song Tabakoya no Musume (タバコやの娘 The Girl at the Tobacconist's). This enka song was soon parodied into juvenile song about the testicles of the tanuki (たんたんたぬき), which goes, "Tan-tan-tanuki's testicles: there isn't any wind, but [they still go] swing swing swing". The parodied version of the song remain popular among Japanese children and adults to this day.

The University of Antioquia in Medellin, Colombia uses the same melody in its official song.

The British band Groove Armada's single "At the River" features a trombone part derived from "Shall We Gather at the River?", played by band member Andy Cato.

References

External links
Lyrics

American Christian hymns
1864 songs
19th-century hymns
Protestant hymns
Hymns by Robert Lowry